Owtar is a town located in the country of Oman in Middle East.

Populated places in Oman